Lyuben Nikolov (born 8 September 1985) is a retired Bulgarian footballer who played as a defender.

Club career

Youth career in "Levski" Sofia and other Bulgarian clubs 
Nikolov grew up as part of Levski Sofia's academy and signed his first professional contract with the senior team in the 2002/2003 season. He signed a 3-year contract, but didn't make any official appearance for the first team. For that time he played on loan for Vihren Sandanski, Rodopa Smolian and Maritsa Plovdiv.

In Bulgaria he also played for Spartak Plovdiv, Nessebar FC, Akademik and Svoge.

FC Dynamo Brest 
In 2013 Nikolov moved to Belarus, where he signed a one-year contract with FC Dynamo Brest.  Because of his good performance, he was offered to renew his contract with the team for one more season. After two seasons in Belarus, Nikolov moved to Thailand.

Sisaket FC 
In the beginning of January 2015, Sisaket FC announced that the club had signed Nikolov to a two-year deal (year two of the contract is a club option). Nikolov made 45 appearances and scored 1 goal during his first season in Thai premier league.

In this season Sisaket FC reached the final of the Toyota Cup, for the first time in the history of the club. They lost 1:0 to Buriram United and Nikolov was awarded a silver medal.

After this great season, Nikolov was chosen by Thaileague Mania in their "11 Top Transfers of 2015 in Thaileague":

References

External links

1985 births
Living people
Bulgarian footballers
Association football defenders
Bulgarian expatriate footballers
Expatriate footballers in Belarus
Expatriate footballers in Thailand
First Professional Football League (Bulgaria) players
Lyuben Nikolov
PFC Levski Sofia players
OFC Vihren Sandanski players
PFC Rodopa Smolyan players
FC Maritsa Plovdiv players
FC Spartak Plovdiv players
PFC Nesebar players
Akademik Sofia players
FC Sportist Svoge players
FC Dynamo Brest players
Lyuben Nikolov
FC Dunav Ruse players
Lyuben Nikolov
Expatriate footballers in Cambodia